The men's kumite 75 kilograms competition at the 2014 Asian Games in Incheon, South Korea was held on 2 October 2014 at the Gyeyang Gymnasium.

Schedule
All times are Korea Standard Time (UTC+09:00)

Results
Legend
H — Won by hansoku (8–0)

Main bracket

Repechage

References

External links
Official website

Men's kumite 75 kg